Benjamain M. "Scaggie" Ciccone (October 10, 1909 – July 7, 1990) was an American football player who played for the Pittsburgh Steelers and the Chicago Cardinals. Ciccone played College football at Duquesne University.

References

1909 births
1990 deaths
American football centers
American football linebackers
Duquesne Dukes football players
Pittsburgh Pirates (football) players
Arizona Cardinals players
Players of American football from Pennsylvania
People from New Castle, Pennsylvania